Donald Frederick Blaxell  (born 1 February 1934, Sydney, New South Wales), is an Australian botanist, botanical collector and taxonomist.

Blaxell worked at the University of New South Wales for 11 years and joined the New south Wales Herbarium in 1968. He was particularly interested in plants from family Orchidaceae and the genus Eucalyptus. He worked extensively with Lawrence Alexander Sidney Johnson through the 1960s completing descriptions of many species. He was also an avid collector, particularly Eucalyptus species, usually with Johnson or L D. Pryor.

Blaxell was appointed as the Australian Botanical Liaison Officer at Kew Gardens between 1974 and 1975.
In 2001, he was awarded an OAM in the Australia Day honours.
Eucalyptus blaxellii was named in his honour by L.A.S.Johnson & K.D. Hill in  1992.

Selected works
Contributions from the New South Wales Herbarium
The Orchids of Australia - the Eastern Temperate Zone, 1971
Blaxell, D F. 1975. The Status of Schlechter's Specimens of Orchidaceae held at the National Herbarium of New South Wales - 2. New Caledonia, Celebes, Borneo, Sumatra, 1975. Telopea 1(1). S. 49–54
Rotherham, E R; B G Briggs; D F Blaxell; R C Carolin. Australian Flora in Colour: Flowers and Plants of New South Wales and Southern Queensland. Together with E. R. Rotherham, B. G. Biggs und R. C. Carolin. Publisher: A.H. & A.W. Reed, Sydney 1975
Notes on Australian Orchidaceae - a new combination in Liparis, 1978. Telopea 1(5). S. 357–358
Type Specimens of Schlechter's Names in Orchidaceae at the Conservatoire et Jardin Botaniques, Geneve, 1978. Telopea 1(5). S. 359–363
A new Species of Stylidium (Stylidiaceae) from the Sydney Region, 1978. Together with M. M. Hindmarsh. Telopea 1(5). S. 365–370
Flowers & Plants of New South Wales & Southern Queensland. Together with E. R. Rotherham, B. G. Briggs and R. C. Carolin. Publisher: Reed Books, Sydney 1979, 192 S., 556 farbige Abbildungen
New Taxa and Combinations in Eucalyptus-4, 1980. Together with L. A. S. Johnson. Telopea 1(6). S. 395–397
The Orchidaceae of German New Guinea. Incorporating the Figure Atlas. Together with R. S. Rogers, H. J. Katz und J. T. Sommons. Melbourne, Australian Orchid Foundation, Melbourne 1982.

References

20th-century Australian botanists
Australian taxonomists
1934 births
Botanists active in Australia
21st-century Australian botanists
Living people
Recipients of the Medal of the Order of Australia
Australian Botanical Liaison Officers